Somadina Adinma  is a Nigerian actor and model. Somadina Adinma started acting in 2003, at a very young age of 8 (eight) when he debuted in a comedy movie titled Charge and Bail. He is best known for his roles in the Nollywood films Ordinary Fellows, Breath of Anger, and Forest of Promises.

Career
In 2007, he was nominated for the award for Best Performance by a Child at 3rd Africa Movie Academy Awards. In 2019, he acted in the drama film Ordinary Fellows in the role 'DJ Cash'.

State of Origin
Anambra State

Hometown
Neni

References

External links
 
 Fan Reveals The Main Problem Of Nollywood Actor, Somadina Adinma
 Somadina Adinma SNUBS Regina Daniels, Says Actress Angela Okorie Is The Legit QUEEN

Living people
Nigerian television actors
People from Lagos
Year of birth missing (living people)
21st-century Nigerian male actors
Nigerian male models
Nnamdi Azikiwe University alumni
Nigerian male television actors
Igbo actors
Nigerian male film actors
Actors from Anambra State
Nigerian television presenters
Residents of Lagos